General Charles Auguste Jean Baptiste Rouen (born 1838, Antwerp), nicknamed “Rouen”, was born in Antwerp, Belgium, on 9 July 1838. He was a historian and Belgian soldier. He married in Brussels on 30 April 1862, to Joséphine (Jose) Straatman, daughter of ship-owner Lambert Straatman and Marie Sophie Fautier.  He was the son of a hero of the Battle of Waterloo and Belgian revolutionary, Guillaume Rouen and Henriette Elius. Rouen was the brother-in-law of General Jean Prosper Beaudrihaye, who married Anne Caroline Straatman, his wife's sister.

Career 
He was a Colonel of the Grenadiers (1891), general lieutenant with the section of activity (1901), member of the committee of staff, and member of the council of improvement of the establishments of reserve training. He also performed a mission at the time of the Italian War of Independence.

Publications and illustrations

Roueb authored works concerning military history and the art of war, but is mainly known for his book, "The Belgian Army. Exposed historical of its organization, its costumes and uniforms, its armament and its tactic since primitive times until our days", Brussels, Lyon-Claesen, 1896. This book was to contain a second volume, but the bankruptcy of the editor prevented its publication. This book is sought by amateur collectors of costumes and military figurines for its illustrations (also by Rouen). Rouen was also a draftsman.

References

1838 births
19th-century Belgian military personnel
Belgian generals
Military personnel from Antwerp
Year of death missing
Writers from Antwerp